Mark Howard Buzby (born October 6, 1956) is a retired United States Navy rear admiral who served as the Administrator of the United States Maritime Administration. He retired from the Navy in 2013 and joined Carnival Cruise Line's Safety & Reliability Review Board. Buzby was nominated to be MARAD Administrator in June 2017 by President Donald Trump, and confirmed to the position by the United States Senate on August 3, 2017. He resigned from the post on January 11, 2021, along with Secretary of Transportation Elaine Chao, to protest the 2021 United States Capitol attack.

Early life and education 
Born in Atlantic City, New Jersey, Buzby grew up in nearby Linwood. Buzby graduated from Admiral Farragut Academy (North) in 1975. He is also a 1979 graduate of the United States Merchant Marine Academy, where he earned his Bachelor of Science degree in Nautical Science and his U.S. Coast Guard Third Mate License. He was commissioned in June 1979. He is also a graduate of the Joint Forces Staff College and holds master's degrees from the U.S. Naval War College and Salve Regina University in Strategic Studies and International Relations.

Career

Buzby relieved Rear Admiral Robert D. Reilly Jr. as Commander of the Military Sealift Command (MSC) on October 16, 2009, and served in the position for about 3.5 years. On May 10, 2013, Buzby was relieved by Rear Admiral (select) Thomas K. Shannon and retired from 34 years of service.

Buzby commanded the destroyer  through the ship's first Mediterranean-Persian Gulf deployment.

Following this tour, Buzby returned to sea as United States Sixth Fleet assistant operations officer, and participated in combat operations as part of NATO’s Operation Allied Force in Kosovo. He then assumed command of Destroyer Squadron 31 as the sea combat commander for the Abraham Lincoln Battle Group during two deployments in support of Operations Southern Watch and Enduring Freedom in Iraq and Afghanistan, respectively.

Ashore, Buzby has served on the Navy staff as the Point Defense Anti-Air Warfare section head for Surface Warfare Division and as Aegis Combat System development officer. Early joint experience was on the Joint Staff, Joint Operations Division as an operations officer and chairman's briefer. He was the 16th commanding officer of Surface Warfare Officers School command.

Buzby took command of Joint Task Force Guantanamo in May 2007 and was relieved by Admiral David M. Thomas Jr. in 2008.

As a flag officer, Buzby has served on the Navy staff as deputy for Surface Ships, deputy for Surface Warfare and deputy for Expeditionary Warfare. He has also served as commander, Joint Task Force Guantanamo, and most recently as deputy chief of Staff for Global Force Management and Joint Operations, United States Fleet Forces Command. Buzby served as the commander of the U.S. Navy's Military Sealift Command from October 2009 to March 2013.

Buzby's personal awards include the Defense Superior Service Medal, Legion of Merit (four awards), Bronze Star, Defense Meritorious Service Medal, Meritorious Service Medal (five awards) and various other unit and campaign awards.

Awards and decorations 
 Surface Warfare Officer insignia

References

External links 

United States Merchant Marine Academy alumni
Admiral Farragut Academy alumni
Living people
1956 births
United States Navy rear admirals (upper half)
Guantanamo Bay detention camp
Trump administration personnel
People from Atlantic City, New Jersey
People from Linwood, New Jersey
United States Department of Transportation officials